Bianca Moon (born 14 December 1988) is an Australian singer-songwriter. She released her first single, a cover of Marc Cohn's "Walking in Memphis at age 14.
Moon is only the second Australian to be nominated for a Daytime Emmy and is also the youngest person ever to be nominated for a technical Emmy Award. She was a 2007 Finalist for the "New South Wales Young Australian of the Year" Award.

Personal life 

Moon was born with the craniofacial disfigurement bletharophimosis, and as a result she began her own charity, "Truly Beautiful" when she was 16.

References 
 

Living people
Australian singer-songwriters
1988 births
Australian Institute of Music alumni
21st-century Australian singers
21st-century Australian women singers
Australian women singer-songwriters